Los Arabos is a municipality and town in the Matanzas Province of Cuba. It is located in the eastern part of the province, bordering the province of Villa Clara.

Geography
The municipality is divided into the barrios of Cabecera, Macagua, Monte Alto and San Pedro de Mayabón.

Demographics
In 2004, the municipality of Los Arabos had a population of 25,702.

See also
Municipalities of Cuba
List of cities in Cuba

References

External links

Populated places in Matanzas Province